The Agency for Healthcare Research and Quality (AHRQ; pronounced "ark" by initiates and often "A-H-R-Q" by the public) is one of twelve agencies within the United States Department of Health and Human Services (HHS). The agency is headquartered in North Bethesda, Maryland, a suburb of Washington, D.C. (with a Rockville mailing address). It was established as the Agency for Health Care Policy and Research (AHCPR) in 1989 as a constituent unit of the Public Health Service (PHS)  to enhance the quality, appropriateness, and effectiveness of health care services and access to care by conducting and supporting research, demonstration projects, and evaluations; developing guidelines; and disseminating information on health care services and delivery systems.

History
AHRQ's earliest predecessor was the National Center for Health Services Research and Development, established in 1968 within the PHS Health Services and Mental Health Administration.  When that administration was split up in 1973, it became the Bureau of Health Services Research within the PHS Health Resources Administration,  It was renamed the National Center for Health Services Research in 1975.  In 1978 it was transferred to the Office of the Assistant Secretary for Health.  In 1985 it was renamed the National Center for Health Services Research and Health Care Technology Assessment.

In 1989, the agency became its own operating agency within PHS, and was renamed Agency for Health Care Policy and Research (AHCPR) under the Omnibus Budget Reconciliation Act of 1989.  During its early years, the Agency for Healthcare Policy and Research implemented large multidisciplinary, multi-institutional projects that focused on patient results in certain medical conditions in an effort to improve clinical practice.  This has included basic health IT research, patient safety research on wrong site surgery, medical teamwork, and hospital acquired conditions such as MRSA and VRE.

However, AHCPR became controversial when it produced several guidelines that some thought would reduce medical drugs and procedures. This included concern from ophthalmologists on a cataract guideline and concern by the pharmaceutical industry over a reduction in the use of new drugs. When the agency produced a guideline that concluded that back pain surgery was unnecessary and potentially harmful, a lobbying campaign aided by Congressmen whose backs had been operated on changed the name of the agency and scaled back the guidelines program, which existed as the National Guideline Clearinghouse. until it was defunded in 2018.

AHCPR was reauthorized December 6, 1999, as the Agency for Healthcare Research and Quality (AHRQ) under the Healthcare Research and Quality Act of 1999, which amended Title IX of the Public Health Service Act (42 U.S.C. 299 et seq).

Funding

The Trump administration proposed to merge the Agency for Healthcare Research and Quality with the National Institutes of Health. The President's FY 2018 Request to Congress for the Agency was for $378.5 million.

The 2015 budget for AHRQ is US$440 million, $24 million less than FY 2014. Within this total, the budget includes $334 million in Public Health Service (PHS) Evaluation Funds, a decrease of $30 million from FY 2014, and $106 million from the Patient-Centered Outcomes Research Trust Fund, an increase of $13 million above FY 2014.

The FY 2015 budget is intended to ensure the Agency continues its progress on health services research to improve outcomes, affordability, and quality. The budget also supports the collection of information on health care spending and use through the Healthcare Cost and Utilization Project (HCUP) and Medical Expenditure Panel Survey (MEPS).

The FY 2015 budget provides $73 million, an increase of $1 million from FY 2014, for AHRQ's patient safety research and dissemination projects that prevent, mitigate, and decrease the number of medical errors, patient safety risks and hazards, and quality gaps. 
The budget includes $23 million, a $6 million decrease from FY 2014, for health information technology (health IT) research, and the development and dissemination of evidence and evidence-based tools to inform policy and practice on how health IT can improve the quality of American health care. In FY 2015, AHRQ will provide $20 million to support 40 grants for foundational health IT research to inform and support the meaningful use of health IT.

In July 2018, the National Guideline Clearinghouse (NGC) and the National Quality Measures Clearinghouse (NQMC), two longtime online resources from the AHRQ, were shut down because federal funding ceased to be available to them. Other stakeholders were exploring options for hosting the NGC ]; should that happen, it will return to the web.

Leadership
Carolyn Clancy M.D. was the director from 2002-2014. Richard Kronick, Ph.D. was director from 2013 to March 2016. Sharon Arnold Ph.D. was acting director from February - April 2016, replacing Richard Kronick in February 2016. Dr. Andrew Bindman was the director of AHRQ from April 2016 until January 2017. Prior to joining AHRQ, Dr. Bindman served as faculty of UCSF School of Medicine. Gopal Khanna, MBA was appointed as Agency director on May 9, 2017, and resigned on January 11, 2021 in response to the January 6 Capitol riot.  Following Khanna's resignation, deputy director Dr. David Meyers, M.D. served as acting director from 2021 to 2022. Robert Otto Valdez was appointed director on February 27, 2022.

Divisions
The Agency has multiple offices and centers including the Center for Evidence and Practice Improvement (CEPI), the Center for Financing, Access and Trends, the Center for Delivery, Organization and Markets, the Center for Quality and Patient Safety, the Office of Management Services, the Office of Extramural Research and Priority Populations, and the Office of Communications. The Office of Communications was previously known as the Office of Communications and Knowledge Transfer.

Within CEPI, the Evidence-Based Practice Centers (EPCs) develop evidence reports and technology assessments on topics relevant to clinical and other health care organization and delivery issues—specifically those that are common, expensive, and/or significant for the Medicare and Medicaid populations. With this program, AHRQ serves as a "science partner" with private and public organizations in their efforts to improve the quality, effectiveness, and appropriateness of health care by synthesizing the evidence and facilitating the translation of evidence-based research findings. Topics are nominated by Federal and non-Federal partners such as professional societies, health plans, insurers, employers, and patient groups.

References

External links
 Official site
 Agency for Healthcare Research and Quality in the Federal Register

Health care quality
Agencies of the United States Public Health Service
Medical and health organizations based in Maryland